The 2014 American Athletic Conference men's soccer tournament was the 2nd edition of the American Athletic Conference Men's Soccer Tournament. The tournament decided the American Athletic Conference champion and guaranteed representative into the 2014 NCAA Division I Men's Soccer Championship.  First round matchups were held at campus sites on Saturday, November 8, while the semifinals were played at Morrone Stadium on the campus of Connecticut in Storrs, Connecticut.

Bracket

References

 
American Athletic Conference Men's Soccer Tournament
American soccer tournament
American soccer tournament